Fulbari is an upazila of Dinajpur District in the Division of Rangpur Division, Bangladesh.

Geography
It has 24816 households and total area 229.55 km2.

Fulbari Upazila is bounded by Parbatiput and Chirirbandar Upazilas on the north, Nawabganj and Birampur  Upazilas on the east, Birampur Upazila on the south and Kumarganj CD Block on the west.

Demographics
As of the 1991 Bangladesh census, Fulbari has a population of 129,435. Males constitute 51.51% of the population, and females 48.49%. This Upazila's population over age of eighteen is 67,837. Fulbari has an average literacy rate of 31.7% (7+ years); the national average is 32.4% literate.
Fulbari Upazila (dinajpur district) with an area of 229.55 km2, is bounded by Parbatipur and Chirirbandar upazilas on the north, Birampur upazila on the south, Nawabganj (Dinajpur) and Birampur upazilas on the east, West Bengal of India on the west. Little Jamuna is the main river.

Fulbari (Town) consists of 9 wards and 11 mahallas. The area of the town is 16.03 km2; population 28557; male 51.05%, female 48.95%. The density of population is 1781 per km2. The literacy rate among the town people is 55.1%.

Economy

Fulbari is an important business centre. Its importance grew significantly with the development of the Barapukuria coal mine and the Madhyapara hardrock mine, both located within a few kilometres from the town.

The government was working in 2006 with Asia Energy (now Global Coal Resources PLc - GCR) on a plan to develop an open-pit mine in Fulbari, Dinajpur. Opponents have protested the plans because of adverse environmental and social effects. An estimated 120,000 people may be displaced, including indigenous groups. Protesters have said such a mine would endanger an important food-producing region, as well as the quality of the water supply depended on by tens of thousands of people. There were major protests in Bangladesh in 2006, and the government closed the mine. As talks began again on the project, protesters conducted a week-long march from Fulbari to Dhaka in October 2010. In December 2010, an alliance of groups protested in London at a meeting of GCR company officials and stockholders.

Administration
Phulbari Thana was formed in 1857 and it was turned into an upazila in 1984.

The Upazila is divided into Fulbari Municipality and seven union parishads: Aladipur, Aloary, Bethdighi, Daulatpur, Kazihal, Khairbari, and Shibnagor. The union parishads are subdivided into 158 mauzas and 152 villages.

Fulbari Municipality is subdivided into 9 wards and 14 mahallas.

Notable residents
 Mansur Ali Sarkar, Former Member of Parliament and Deputy Minister for Education, lived in Fulbari. 
 Mainus Sultan, Bangla Academy Literary Award-winning travel author, was born in Fulbari village under the upazila in 1956.
Mustafizur Rahman Fizar, Current Member of Parliament. Formerly, Minister of Primary and Mass Education, State Minister for Land, and State Minister for Environment and Forestry of Government of Bangladesh.

See also
Districts of Bangladesh, Dinajpur
Divisions of Bangladesh, Rangpur

References

Upazilas of Dinajpur District, Bangladesh